Jamaica has diplomatic relations with many nations and is a member of the United Nations and the Organization of American States. Jamaica chairs the Working Group on smaller Economies.

Jamaica is an active member of the Commonwealth of Nations and the Non-Aligned Movement (G-77). Jamaica is a beneficiary of the Lome Conventions, through which the European Union (EU) grants trade preferences to selected states in Asia, the Caribbean, and the Pacific, and has played a leading role in the negotiations of the successor agreement in Fiji in 2000.

Disputes - international:
none

Illicit drugs:
Transshipment point for cocaine from Central and South America to North America and Europe; illicit cultivation of cannabis; government has an active manual cannabis eradication program

The Ministry of Foreign Affairs and Foreign Trade is the government ministry responsible for handling Jamaica's external relations and foreign trade.

History 
Historically, Jamaica has had close ties with the UK. Trade, financial, and cultural relations with the United States are now predominant. Jamaica is linked with the other countries of the English-speaking Caribbean through the Caribbean Community (CARICOM), and more broadly through the Association of Caribbean States (ACS). Jamaica has served two 2-year terms on the United Nations Security Council, in 1979-80 and 2000-2001.

In the follow-on meetings to the December 1994 Summit of the Americas, Jamaica—together with Uruguay—was given the responsibility of coordinating discussions on invigorating society.

Diplomatic Relations
List of countries which Jamaica maintains diplomatic relations with:

Bilateral relations

Jamaica maintains economic and cultural relations with Taiwan via Taipei Economic and Cultural Office in Canada.

Jamaica and the Commonwealth

Jamaica has been a member state of the Commonwealth of Nations since 1962 when it became an independent Commonwealth realm.

Multilateral membership 
African, Caribbean and Pacific Group of States,
Caricom, 
CCC, 
Caribbean Development Bank, 
United Nations Economic Commission for Latin America and the Caribbean, 
Food and Agriculture Organization, 
G-15, 
G-33, 
G-77, 
Inter-American Development Bank, 
International Atomic Energy Agency, 
International Bank for Reconstruction and Development, 
International Civil Aviation Organization, 
International Red Cross and Red Crescent Movement, 
International Fund for Agricultural Development, 
International Finance Corporation, 
International Federation of Red Cross and Red Crescent Societies, 
International Hydrographic Organization (pending member), 
International Labour Organization, 
International Monetary Fund, 
International Telecommunication Union, 
Intelsat, 
Interpol, 
International Olympic Committee, 
International Organization for Migration, 
International Organization for Standardization, 
International Telecommunication Union, 
Latin American Economic System, 
Non-Aligned Movement, 
Organization of American States, 
OPANAL, 
Organisation for the Prohibition of Chemical Weapons, 
United Nations, 
UN Security Council (temporary), 
United Nations Conference on Trade and Development, 
UNESCO, 
United Nations Industrial Development Organization, 
Universal Postal Union, 
World Health Organization, 
World Intellectual Property Organization, 
World Meteorological Organization, 
World Tourism Organization, 
World Trade Organization

See also

List of diplomatic missions in Jamaica
List of diplomatic missions of Jamaica

References

 
 Jamaica and the Commonwealth of Nations